The Left Opposition was a faction within the Russian Communist Party (b) from 1923 to 1927 headed de facto by Leon Trotsky. The Left Opposition formed as part of the power struggle within the party leadership that began with the Soviet founder Vladimir Lenin's illness and intensified with his death in January 1924. Originally, the battle lines were drawn between Trotsky and his supporters who signed The Declaration of 46 in October 1923 on the one hand and a triumvirate (also known by its Russian name troika) of Comintern chairman Grigory Zinoviev, Communist Party General Secretary Joseph Stalin and Politburo chairman Lev Kamenev on the other hand.

The Left Opposition argued that the New Economic Policy had weakened the Soviet Union by allowing the private sector to achieve an increasingly important position in the Soviet economy while in their opinion, the centrally planned, socialised sector of the economy languished (including the mostly state-run heavy industries which were seen as essential not only for continued industrialisation but also defence). The platform called for the state to adopt a programme for mass industrialisation and to encourage the mechanization and collectivisation of agriculture, thereby developing the means of production and helping the Soviet Union move towards parity with Western capitalist countries, which would also increase the proportion of the economy which was part of the socialised sector of the economy and definitively shift the Soviet Union towards a socialist mode of production.

There was also the Right Opposition, which was led by the leading party theoretician and Pravda editor Nikolai Bukharin and supported by Sovnarkom Chairman (prime minister) Alexei Rykov. In late 1924, as Stalin proposed his new socialism in one country theory, Stalin drew closer to the Right Opposition and his triumvirate with Grigory Zinoviev and Lev Kamenev slowly broke up over the next year (Zinoviev and Kamenev were both executed in 1936). The Right Opposition were allied to Stalin's Centre from late 1924 until their alliance broke up in the years from 1928–1930 over strategy towards the kulaks and NEPmen. Trotsky and his supporters in the Left Opposition were joined by the Group of Democratic Centralism to form the United (or Joint) Opposition.

History 
The first confrontation between the Left Opposition and the triumvirate occurred from October 1923 to January 1924 over industrialization policies. The triumvirate won decisively at the XIII Party Conference in January 1924. Following Lenin's death in January 1924, the confrontation between the Left Opposition and the triumvirate expanded more openly into a dispute over Trotsky's policies, with the triumvirate accusing Trotsky's policies of being "anti-Leninist". At the XIIIth Communist Party Congress in May 1924, the triumvirate's position was further strengthened at the Left Opposition's expense. Another confrontation took place from October to December 1924, during the so-called "Literary Discussion" and criticism of Trotsky's permanent revolution policy as Stalin proposed socialism in one country. This resulted in the removal of Trotsky from his ministerial post on 6 January 1925, although Stalin opposed Zinoviev's demand that Trotsky be expelled from the Communist Party.

With Trotsky largely marginalized, Zinoviev and Kamenev had a falling out with Stalin at the XIVth Communist Party Conference in April 1925 over Stalin's October 1924 proposal of Socialism in One Country, which Zinoviev and Kamenev now openly opposed. By this time, the Right Opposition leader, Bukharin, had elaborated on Stalin's socialism in one country policy, giving it a theoretical justification. This solidified the Right Opposition as Stalin's main allies, as the triumvirate of Stalin-Zinoviev-Kamenev from recent years broke up. Soon after the April 1925 Conference, Zinoviev and Kamenev formed the New Opposition, but they were defeated by Stalin, who was again supported by Bukharin and Rykov, at the XIVth Party Congress in December 1925. Soon after their defeat at the Congress, Zinoviev and Kamenev joined forces with Trotsky's Left Opposition in early 1926, in what became known as the United Opposition. From July to October 1926, the United Opposition lost out to Stalin, and its leaders were expelled from the ruling Politburo.

In October 1927, soon after catastrophic events regarding the Chinese Revolution of 1925-27, which confirmed the United Opposition's critical analysis of the Communist Party's support for the nationalist Kuomintang, the last United Opposition members were expelled from the Communist Party Central Committee; and in November 1927, Trotsky and Zinoviev were expelled from the Communist Party itself. In December 1927, the XVth Party Congress declared Left Opposition and Trotskyist views to be incompatible with Communist Party membership and expelled all leading Left Opposition supporters from the Party.

After their expulsion by the XVth Congress, Zinoviev, Kamenev and their supporters immediately surrendered to Stalin, "admitted their mistakes" and were readmitted to the Communist Party in 1928, although they never regained their former influence and eventually perished in the Great Purge. Trotsky and his supporters, on the other hand, refused to capitulate to Stalin and were exiled to remote areas of the Soviet Union in early 1928. Trotsky was eventually expelled from the country in February 1929, sent into exile in Turkey. Trotsky's supporters remained in exile, but their resolve began to waver in 1929 as Stalin turned against Bukharin and Rykov and adopted the policy of collectivization, which appeared to be close to the policies that the Left Opposition had advocated earlier. The Left Opposition attempted to field opposition candidates against the official Communist Party candidates in the 1929 elections, but to no avail. Most (but not all) prominent Left Opposition members recanted between 1929 and 1934, but they nearly all perished during the Great Purge of the mid-late 1930s along with the Oppositionists who remained unrepentant.

Some of its members, while claiming to have given up on their old views, participated in the underground opposition in the USSR. They, like I.N. Smirnov, even maintained contact with Trotsky and his son Sedov. During this period, the trostkyists entered an opposition bloc with several other groups, for example the members of the former Right Opposition. Historian Pierre Broué stated that the opposition groups were dissolved in early 1933, when many of its members were arrested. However, some documents found in 2018 showed that the Underground Left Opposition stayed active even in prison, in fact, the prisons became their centers of activities.

In the meantime, Trotsky founded the International Left Opposition in 1930. It was meant to be an opposition group within the Comintern, but members of the Comintern were immediately expelled as soon as they joined (or were suspected of joining) the ILO. The ILO therefore concluded that opposing Stalinism from within the communist organizations controlled by Stalin's supporters had become impossible, so new organizations had to be formed. In 1933, the ILO was renamed the International Communist League (ICL), which formed the basis of the Fourth International, founded in Paris in 1938.

Leading members of the Left Opposition 

 Leon Trotsky (Lev Davidovich Bronstein) (1879–1940), People's Commissar for Foreign Affairs, founder and commander of the Red Army and People's Commissar of War during the Russian Civil War, and de facto leader of the Left Opposition. Expelled from the USSR in 1929, he went on to found the Fourth International. Murdered by a Soviet agent in 1940.
 Alexander Beloborodov (1891–1938).
 Mikhail Boguslavsky (1886–1937).
 Andrei Bubnov (1884–1938), signed the Declaration of the 46 in October 1923, but defected to Stalin soon thereafter. Later head of the Communist Party organization within the Red Army and then People Commissar (minister) of Education. Expelled from the Party Central Committee in November 1937, arrested and perished in the Great Purge.
 Chen Duxiu (1879–1942): founder of the Chinese Communist Party, from which he was expelled in 1927, and went on to found the Chinese Left Opposition
 Yakov Drobnis (1890–1937).
 Adolph Joffe (1883–1927).
 Iosif Kosior (1893–1937).
 Nikolai Krestinsky (1883–1938).
 Sergei Mrachkovsky (1883–1936).
 Nikolai Muralov (1877–1937), once Deputy People's Commissar of Agriculture and Moscow district commander of the Red Army.
 Valerian Obolensky (also known as N. Osinsky) (1887–1938), one of the leaders of the Group of Democratic Centralism.
 Georgy Oppokov (also known as A. Lomov) (1888–1937).
 Yevgeni Preobrazhensky (1886–1937), the economic theoretician of the Left Opposition, the author of The New Economics.
 Georgy Pyatakov (1890–1937).
 Karl Radek (1885–1939).
 Christian Rakovsky (1873–1941).
 Timofei Sapronov (1887–1937), one of the leaders of the Group of Democratic Centralism.
 Victor Serge (1890–1947), went into exile.
 Ivar Smilga (Ivar Tenisovich Smilga) (1892–1937), chairman of the Regional Committee of the Soviets in Finland in 1917, chairman of Tsentrobalt, Central Committee of the Baltic Fleet, 1917–1918).
 Ivan Nikitich Smirnov (1881–1936).
 Vladimir Smirnov (1887–1937), one of the leaders of the Group of Democratic Centralism.
 Lev Sosnovsky (1886–1937), former head of Agitprop and journalist.

See also 
 Anti-Stalinist left
 Dewey Commission
 International Bureau of Revolutionary Youth Organizations
 Primitive socialist accumulation
 Scissors Crisis

References 

 
1923 establishments in the Soviet Union
1927 disestablishments in the Soviet Union
Factions in the Communist Party of the Soviet Union
Anti-Stalinist left
Communist parties in the Soviet Union
Trotskyism in Russia